Lawrenceoceras is a genus of moderately curved, gently expanding bassleroceratids (Nautiloidia, Ellesmerocerida) from the Lower Ordovician of eastern North America.  Septa dividing the chambers are close spaced; sutures straight, transverse; the siphuncle narrow, submarginal.

Lawrenceoceras is closely related to  nautiloids such as Bassleroceras that gave rise to the Tarphycerida although it specifically may not be ancestral.

References

 W.M.Furnish & Brian F. Glenister, 1964.  Nautiloidea - Ellesmerocerida; Treatise on Invertebrate Paleontology, Part K. Geological Society of America.
 Lawrenceoceras in Fossilworks

Prehistoric nautiloid genera
Ellesmerocerida
Paleozoic life of Quebec